Achery may refer to:

 Achery, Aisne, a commune in France
 Luc d'Achery (1609–1685), Maurist librarian and historian